José Proceso Pozuelo y Herrero (Born 2 July 1828, died 23 March 1913) was a Spanish prelate of the Catholic Church, who served successively as apostolic administrator of Ceuta, bishop of Canarias, Segovia and Córdoba

Biography
Born in Pozoblanco on July 2, 1828, he studied at the Córdoba Seminary, where he later became a professor. He was ordained as a priest in 1853.

He was appointed apostolic administrator of Ceuta and titular bishop of Antipatris in 1877 by Pope Pius IX, in 1879 he became Bishop of Canarias. Eleven years later, in 1890 he was appointed to the diocese of Segovia and in 1898 he was named bishop of Córdoba.  He died in Córdoba on 23 March 1913.

References

Spanish Roman Catholic bishops
Bishops appointed by Pope Pius IX
1828 births
1913 deaths